Sennaya Square
or Sennaya Ploshchad (literally: Hay Square), is a large city square in Central Saint Petersburg, located at the crossing of Garden Street, Moskovsky Prospekt (formerly Zabalkansky Prospekt) and Grivtsova Lane (formerly Demidov Lane).

The square was established in 1737 as a market where hay, firewood and cattle were sold. It was built under the extension of the Garden Street, and grew quickly, becoming the cheapest and the most active market in Saint Petersburg. The Hay Market was a place where merchants and farmers could trade. It was there that malefactors were flogged before a large concourse of people.

In 1753, local merchants commissioned the building of the Church of the Assumption of the Mother of God in a sumptuous Baroque style. In the middle of the square is a former guardhouse (1818–20). Cholera riots took place in the square in 1831. The surrounding district was known for its infamous slums, which provide the setting for Fedor Dostoevsky's novel Crime and Punishment.

In 1952, Joseph Stalin renamed the square Ploshchad Mira. In 1961, at the height of Nikita Khrushchev's anti-religious campaign, he had the church demolished; a chapel now marks the site. In 1992, the square's original name was restored.

Three metro stations serve the square; its namesake Sennaya Ploshchad, Sadovaya (Garden Street) and Spasskaya. It is also a bus and marshrutka station. It used to have regular tram transportation until 2010, a fragment of the tram rails having been preserved as a historical mark.

See also
 List of squares in Saint Petersburg

References

Sources

External links
 Illustrated history of Sennaya Square
 

Squares in Saint Petersburg